The Australian Rock Database was a website with a searchable online database that listed details of Australian rock music artists, albums, bands, producers and record labels. It was established in 2000 by Swedish national Magnus Holmgren, who had developed an interest in Australian music when visiting as an exchange student. Information for the database entries was initially gleaned from Chris Spencer, Zbig Nowara and Paul McHenry's  Who's Who of Australian Rock (3rd ed, 1993) and Ian McFarlane's Encyclopedia of Australian Rock and Pop (1999). Australian Government's former website on Culture and Recreation listed Australian Rock Database as a resource for Australian rock music.

References

General
 
  NOTE: Online copy is an archive of the Worldwide Home of Australian Music and More Online (WHAMMO) website from 3 August 2004 and full functionality is not available.

Specific

Databases in Australia
Online music and lyrics databases
Australian music websites